"Et s'il n'en restait qu'une (je serais celle-là)" (meaning "And If There Were Only One Woman Left (I Would Be That One)") is the first hit single from Celine Dion's French-language album, D'elles. It premiered on the radio in France, Quebec, Switzerland and Belgium on 14 February 2007 and was released as a music download on the same day. The CD single was released on 13 April 2007 in Francophone countries. The song topped the chart in France.

Background and release
"Et s'il n'en restait qu'une (je serais celle-là)" was written by Françoise Dorin and composed by David Gategno, who also produced the track. Dorin is a writer, born in France. Her best-selling novels include Virginie et Paul, la seconde dans Rome (1980), Les lits à une place, les jupes culotte (1984), and Les corbeaux et les renardes (1988). Other works include the plays La facture (1968), Un sale egoiste, l'intoxe (1980), and a musical comedy, La valise en carton, as well as many humorous texts. Gategno already worked with Tina Arena, Natasha St-Pier, Chimène Badi, Faudel, and Nolwenn Leroy.

The title comes from the famous last verse of the poem « Ultima verba » in Les Châtiments by Victor Hugo « Et s'il n'en reste qu'un, je serai celui-là ! ».

The music video was directed by Thierry Vargnes in New York City on 31 January 2007, and premiered on the Canadian television network TVA on 1 April 2007.

"Et s'il n'en restait qu'une (je serais celle-là)" debuted at number 1 on the French Singles Chart, becoming Dion's fifth number 1 in that country. It spent 33 weeks on the chart, becoming one of her longest-running singles. Dion's last song which stayed that long on the chart was "Pour que tu m'aimes encore" with 34 weeks.

In other countries, "Et s'il n'en restait qu'une (je serais celle-là)" peaked at number 2 in Quebec, number 4 in Belgium Wallonia and number 34 in Switzerland.

Dion performed it live during the French concerts of her 2008-09 Taking Chances World Tour, and during her historic performance in front of 250,000 spectators to celebrate Quebec's 400th anniversary, which was included on Céline sur les Plaines DVD in 2008.  A live version was included in the CD/DVD Tournée Mondiale Taking Chances: Le Spectacle.

"Et s'il n'en restait qu'une (je serais celle-là)" was nominated for the Chérie FM Star in category French Song of the Year.

Critical reception
Stephen Thomas Erlewine of AllMusic highlighted this song.

Track listing and formats
European CD single
"Et s'il n'en restait qu'une (je serais celle-là)" – 3:32
"Je ne vous oublie pas" (500 Choristes Version) – 3:35
"Et s'il n'en restait qu'une (je serais celle-là)" (Instrumental Version) – 3:32

Charts

Weekly charts

Year-end charts

Release history

See also
List of number-one singles of 2007 (France)

References

Celine Dion songs
2007 singles
French-language songs
SNEP Top Singles number-one singles
Songs written by Françoise Dorin
2007 songs
Epic Records singles
Columbia Records singles